Island Bridge, formerly Sarah or Sarah's Bridge, is a road bridge spanning the River Liffey, in Dublin, Ireland which joins the South Circular Road to Conyngham Road at the Phoenix Park.

Island Bridge and the surrounding area (often known as Islandbridge) are so named because of the island formed here by the creation of a mill race towards the right bank while the main current flows to the left. The River Camac emerges from a tunnel further downstream towards Dublin Heuston railway station.

History
In 1577, during the reign of Queen Elizabeth, while Sir Henry Sidney was Lord Deputy of Ireland, an arched stone bridge was built here to replace an earlier structure nearby at Kilmainham.

This bridge was swept away by a flood in 1787, and between 1791 and 1793 the replacement bridge, that is standing today, was constructed. The structure is a single 32-metre span ashlar masonry elliptical arch bridge and was originally named Sarah's Bridge after Sarah Fane, Countess of Westmorland, wife of the then Lord Lieutenant of Ireland, who laid the first stone on 22 June 1791.

The bridge was renamed Island Bridge in 1922 following independence from Britain of the Free State, similarly to many other Dublin bridges originally named for British peers.

The bridge has become synonymous with the area, and the residential area around the bridge is now commonly known as "Islandbridge".

See also
Clancy Quay

Gallery

References

Bridges in Dublin (city)
Bridges completed in 1793
1793 establishments in Ireland
Uppercross